Moravian Serbia may refer to:

 in terms of geography, region of Serbia corresponding to the basin of the Morava River
 in terms of medieval history: Moravian Serbia, a medieval Serbian Principality (1371–1402)
 descriptive term for the Habsburg Kingdom of Serbia (1718–1739)
 descriptive term for the autonomous Principality of Serbia (1815–1882)
 descriptive term for the independent Kingdom of Serbia (1882–1918)
 descriptive term for the Yugoslav Moravian Banate (1929–1941)
 descriptive term for the modern Central Serbia

See also 
 Serbia (disambiguation)
 Habsburg Serbia (disambiguation)
 Ottoman Serbia (disambiguation)